Anne Minh-Thu Quach (born August 14, 1982) is a Canadian politician who represented the electoral district of Salaberry—Suroît in the House of Commons of Canada from 2011 to 2019. She served as a member of the New Democratic Party.

Early life and education
Born in Salaberry-de-Valleyfield, Quebec, Quach received a diploma in health sciences from the Cégep de Valleyfield in 2001 and a bachelor's degree in secondary education from the Université de Sherbrooke in 2005.

Educational career
She taught French at École Edgar-Hébert for five years and another short stint from August 2010 to May 2011 at École Baie-St-François. Very active in the Syndicat de l'enseignement de Champlain, the regional teachers union that includes Longueuil, she served for three years on its executive committee and represented it on the general council of the Centrale des Syndicats du Québec, the union central that includes over 100,000 teachers and about 75,000 other employees in health, social services, community, culture and recreation.

Political career
Elected in 2011, she is one of three Vietnamese Canadians to have been elected to the House of Commons, following Ève-Mary Thaï Thi Lac and alongside Hoang Mai.

Personal life
Quach speaks French and English. She is married and has a daughter who was born in 2014.

Electoral record

References

External links

Members of the House of Commons of Canada from Quebec
New Democratic Party MPs
Women members of the House of Commons of Canada
Canadian people of Vietnamese descent
Canadian schoolteachers
Living people
People from Salaberry-de-Valleyfield
1982 births
Women in Quebec politics
Canadian politicians of Vietnamese descent
Université de Sherbrooke alumni
21st-century Canadian politicians
21st-century Canadian women politicians